The Big Tree (also known as the Trout Lake Big Tree) was a massive Ponderosa pine tree in an old-growth pine and fir forest in southern Washington state, at the southern base of Mount Adams. The area is managed by the Mount Adams Ranger District of the Gifford Pinchot National Forest. It had been stressed by attacks from mountain pine beetles and its death in 2015 was confirmed the following year.

Accessibility 
From the small farming community of Trout Lake, the Big Tree Interpretive Site can be accessed via Forest Road 80 and 8020. The interpretive site offers the opportunity to view or picnic at the base of the tree.

Age
Its age was unknown, partially because of rot in its center sections.

Despite having immense tracts of old growth conifers, the State of Washington is one of two states that lacks a state coordinator to find, track and keep current records on important trees.

See also
 List of individual trees

References

Further reading

External links
Trout Lake Big Tree – Wicky Creek Shelter Loop 05-22-16

Individual pine trees
Roadside attractions in Washington (state)
Nature centers in Washington (state)
Mount Adams (Washington)
Gifford Pinchot National Forest
Individual trees in Washington (state)
2010s individual tree deaths